Warren Wilson College (WWC) is a private liberal arts college in Swannanoa, North Carolina. It is known for its curriculum that combines academics, work, and service as every student must complete a requisite course of study, work an on-campus job, and perform community service. Warren Wilson is one of the few colleges in the United States that requires students to work for the institution in order to graduate and is one of only nine colleges in the Work Colleges Consortium.

The college is notable for its environs.

Warren Wilson College is affiliated with the Presbyterian Church (USA).

History 

Warren Wilson College went through many phases before becoming what it is today. Its property, situated along the Swannanoa River, was purchased in 1893 by the Women's Board of Home Missions of the Presbyterian Church. They were concerned that many Americans in isolated areas were not getting a proper education and decided to establish church-supported schools in impoverished areas. A professional staff of three offered the first three grades of elementary instruction.

In 1923, the school graduated its first high school class. A Presbyterian church was started at the school in 1925 so students and teachers would no longer have to walk three miles to Riceville; it was also named for Warren Hugh Wilson, former superintendent of the Presbyterian Church's Department of Church and Country Life.

The first post-high school programs offering vocational training began in 1936. In 1942, the Asheville Farm School merged with the Dorland-Bell School in Hot Springs, North Carolina, to become a coed secondary school. It was named Warren H. Wilson Vocational Junior College and Associated Schools.

After World War II, the public education system in North Carolina improved dramatically and the need for the high school diminished. The last high school class was graduated in 1957. In 1952, the college became one of the first in the South to desegregate, when it invited Alma Shippy, an African American from Swannanoa, North Carolina, to attend. Sunderland dorm residents voted 54–1 to allow Shippy to become a student and live in their dorm.

Warren Wilson College was a junior college until 1967, when it became a four-year college offering six majors. In 1972, the National Board of Missions deeded the WWC property to the college's Board of Trustees. With its expansion of programs and to a four-year curriculum, Warren Wilson now enrolls students of many different geographic and socioeconomic backgrounds. This is in contrast to the original student population of underprivileged mountain youth for basic education.

The eighth president, Dr. Lynn Morton, is the first female president in the college's history. She is a native North Carolinian and was formerly provost and vice president of academic affairs at Queens University in Charlotte, North Carolina.

Academics

Undergraduate
The foundation of the school's undergraduate curriculum establishes that all students earn 128 hours of academic credit, work 8–15 hours per week for the school, and complete the Community Engagement Commitment. Students earn $7.25 per hour that goes directly towards their tuition. Unlike other schools in the Work College Consortium, students at Warren Wilson do not receive traditional pay checks.

Required subjects include Artistic Expression, History and Political Science, Language and Global Issues, Literature, Mathematics, Natural Sciences, Philosophy and Religious Studies, and Social Sciences to graduate and receive a Bachelor of Arts or Bachelor of Science degree. In addition to traditional liberal arts majors such as biology and English, undergraduates have the option of majoring in Outdoor Leadership or Environmental Studies. The Natural Science Undergraduate Research Sequence (NSURS) is the undergraduate research and presentation that is required for all Bachelor of Science degrees given by the college.

Work program 
WWC has more than 70 work crews that are supported by students who commit to working 150, 225, or 300 hours each semester, helping to cover a portion of the cost of attendance. Work Crews contribute in different areas, assuming administrative, academic, custodial, land management duties on campus. :

Community engagement 
Community engagement is a required activity to graduate. Students engage with a wide variety of issues, but the most time is committed and the deepest partnerships are developed in the following designated Issue Areas:

 The Environment
 Food Security
 Housing & Homelessness
 Race & Immigration
 Youth & Education

Graduate degree programs
Since 1981 the college has offered the Warren Wilson College MFA Program for Writers, which awards a Master of Fine Arts in Creative Writing. Warren Wilson offered a Master of Arts in Critical & Historical Craft Studies until Spring 2022.

Athletics 
The Warren Wilson athletic teams are called the Owls. The college is a provisional member of the NCAA Division III ranks, primarily competing in the Coast to Coast Athletic Conference (C2C) for most of its sports since the 2022–23 academic year; while its men's and women's swimming teams compete in the Sun Coast Swimming Conference (SCSC). All varsity teams except cycling are competed under the USCAA, while collegiate cycling is governed by USA Cycling (USAC). At one point, the college also had football and baseball teams, although they have not existed for multiple decades.

The Owls previously competed as an NCAA D-III Independent from 2020–21 to 2021–22, and as an NAIA Independent within the Association of Independent Institutions (AII) of the National Association of Intercollegiate Athletics (NAIA) from 2010–11 to 2011–12. Warren Wilson was also a member of the United States Collegiate Athletic Association (USCAA), primarily competing as a founding member of the Eastern Metro Athletic Conference (EMAC) for most of its sports from 2018–19 to 2019–20; 

Warren Wilson competes in 20 intercollegiate varsity sports: Men's sports include basketball, cross country, cyclocross, lacrosse, mountain biking, road cycling, soccer, swimming and tennis; while women's sports include basketball, cross country, cyclocross, lacrosse, mountain biking, road cycling, soccer, swimming and tennis. The college also has club teams for timber sports and paddling.

NCAA Division III
In March 2019, it was announced that the college will be joining the NCAA Division III membership process, and in April 2020, the Owls were admitted as Division III provisional members for a three-year period. They have been seeking to join a conference during the transition.

On July 27, 2022, Warren Wilson was invited to join the C2C, beginning in the 2022–23 academic year.

Accomplishments
The mountain biking team finished on the podium for 14 consecutive years at collegiate national championships until 2016, when they won the team omnium in Varsity Division II. In 2017 they finished fourth, for a 16th consecutive year on the podium. Although the mountain biking team was formed in the 1990s, the road and cyclocross teams were not added until much later. They did not compete at the national championship level until the 2013–14 and 2014–15 academic years, respectively. In 2016, the cyclocross team placed fourth in the DII team omnium at nationals and third in the team relay.

The men's basketball team won the USCAA DII national title in 2013.

The women's cross country team won the USCAA national title in 2000.

Campus construction projects
There are two major construction projects underway or recently completed on campus as of the 2019–2020 academic year. A new academic building, Myron Boon Hall, constructed on the site formerly occupied by Carson Hall, was completed in May 2018. Lord Aeck Sargent was the prime architect and lead designer of the building. PFA Architects, of Asheville, was the associate architect and collaborated with Lord Aeck Sargent in all phases. H&M Constructors led the building's construction effort. The building is LEED Gold Certified. It has six classrooms of varying sizes, and larger meeting spaces similar in size to the existing Canon Lounge in Gladfelter, to offer more spaces for large community events.

The college's pool has been closed since 2014, when repairs to structural beams were deemed too expensive. Demolition and construction of a new pool structure began in 2017. Buncombe County contributed $300,000 to the project, with the understanding that local swim teams would also be able to use the pool. Construction encountered major setbacks. Although originally planned to be completed for the 2017–18 swim season, work on the internal aspects of the pool were still underway as of July 2019. The exterior was mostly completed by then and remains inaccessible since 2022.

Notable alumni 

 Emil Amos, musician, member of Grails
 Sara Benincasa, comedian
 Bianca Canizio, United States Virgin Islands women's international soccer player
 Reginald Dwayne Betts, poet, teacher, lawyer. Awarded a MacArthur Fellowship in 2021.
 Tony Earley, writer
 James Franco, actor, poet (MFA)
 Rayna Gellert, fiddler
 Lee Meitzen Grue, poet and educator
 A. Van Jordan, poet (MFA)
 Vyvyane Loh, writer, choreographer, physician (MFA)
 Grace Dane Mazur, author
 Heather McElhatton, public radio producer, writer (MFA)
 Lewis Pullman, actor and son of Bill Pullman
 Katie Spotz, youngest Atlantic solo rower
 Duncan Trussell, comedian 
 David Weber, writer
 Joe Wenderoth, poet 
 Billy Edd Wheeler, singer/songwriter
 David Wilcox, folk musician
Fran Wilde, writer (MFA)

References

External links 

 
 Official athletics website

 
Private universities and colleges in North Carolina
Liberal arts colleges in North Carolina
Education in Buncombe County, North Carolina
Educational institutions established in 1894
Universities and colleges accredited by the Southern Association of Colleges and Schools
Universities and colleges affiliated with the Presbyterian Church (USA)
Buildings and structures in Buncombe County, North Carolina
USCAA member institutions
Work colleges
1894 establishments in North Carolina